Lake Irving is a lake in Beltrami County, Minnesota, in the United States.

Lake Irving was named for Washington Irving, the American author.

See also
List of lakes in Minnesota

References

Lakes of Minnesota
Lakes of Beltrami County, Minnesota